The Bhagavad Gita a Hindu scripture in Sanskrit that is part of the Mahabharata.

Bhagavad Gita may also refer to:
The Song Celestial by Sir Edwin Arnold
Bhagavad Gita - Song of God by Swami Prabhavananda and Christopher Isherwood
Bhagavad-Gītā as It Is, a translation and commentary of the Bhagavad Gita by A.C. Bhaktivedanta Swami Prabhupada
God Talks with Arjuna: The Bhagavad Gita by Paramahansa Yogananda
Bhagavad Gita (Sargeant), a 1979 translation of the scripture by Winthrop Sargeant
Bhagavad Gita (film), a 1993 film by G. V. Iyer

See also
Bhagavad Gita trial in Russia
Influence of Bhagavad Gita